Jean Lacy (born 1932 in Washington, D.C.) is an American museum education specialist and visual artist who works primarily in mixed media and collage.

She is of African American heritage, and believes her family is descended from indentured Africans at Jamestown Colony. Her work is inspired by creation myths and religious stories, the Civil Rights Movement, and African American culture. From 1975-77 she held the position of Curator of Education and Exhibitions at the Museum of African-American Life and Culture in Dallas, Texas. From 1977-88 she served as the Director of the African American Cultural Heritage Center of the Dallas Independent School District.

Exhibitions
In 2009, Lacy had a solo exhibition, Divine Kinship: Ancient Forms and Social Commentary, the Art of Jean Lacy, at the Tyler Museum of Art. Her work has been included in the group exhibitions including Black Artists/South at the Huntsville Museum of Art in Alabama; the National Urban League Expo in Houston, TX, and in the African American Artists of Dallas exhibition at Southern Methodist University Gallery.

Collections
Lacy's work is in the collection of the Dallas Museum of Art, and the Museum of Fine Arts, Houston.

Public Art
Lacy has been commissioned was commissioned to create a stained glass window honoring Rosa Parks at the Sanctuary of St. Luke's United Methodist Church in Dallas, TX. She has also received commissions for stained glass windows in Houston.

Awards, honors
In 1995, Lacy received the Women's Caucus for Art Lifetime Achievement Award.

References

1932 births
Living people
African-American artists
American women artists
American women educators
University of North Texas alumni
Art Students League of New York alumni
Otis College of Art and Design alumni
Artists from Washington, D.C.
Educators from New York City
21st-century African-American people
21st-century African-American women
20th-century African-American people
20th-century African-American women
Museum educators